Jiří Benhák is a former Czechoslovak slalom canoeist who competed from the mid-1970s to the early 1980s.

He won two medals in the C-2 team event at the ICF Canoe Slalom World Championships, with a gold in 1977 and a silver in 1975.

References
Overview of athlete's results at canoeslalom.net

Czechoslovak male canoeists
Living people
Year of birth missing (living people)
Medalists at the ICF Canoe Slalom World Championships